Salgira is an Urdu-language Pakistani black-and-white film released in 1969. It is a melodious love story directed by Qamar Zaidi and produced by Najma Hassan and written by Shams Hanafi. The film stars Waheed Murad and Shamim Ara in leading roles. Film's story is based on the lost and found formula. The plot revolves around a girl who gets lost in her childhood but when her parents find her, she gets caught in a murder case.

The film marked the presence of Asif Ali Zardari as an actor, the eleventh President of Pakistan. He appeared in the film in his childhood as the younger version of Murad's character.

Plot

Salma splits accidentally from her parents in her childhood during a train journey. Jalal, a ruffian takes him and hand over her to Rasheeda, a woman who is a singer and raises her. She names her Shabana, teaches her singing and after years Shabana becomes the famous singer of the country who uses to sing on radio and public loves to listen him.

Anwar also loves to listen Shabana and in this passion, he reaches to radio station a day to see her. After that, he usually meets her including a meeting in a poetry competition. They spend time together and fall in love with each other. One day after seeing her childhood doll in his house, Shabana realises that Anwar is the same child who takes her to his house when her parents had left her. There, he tells her that they will search for her parents together.

One day Ashar, Judge of the court where Anwar is a lawyer requests to bring Shabana in his house at the occasion of his daughter's birthday who had lost years ago. Shabana goes there and, she attaches so much with them in first meeting as they have lost their children, and she has lost her parents.

Jalal, the man who has abducted the Shabana returns to the country, and now wants to get money from her and for this purpose he sells her. He sends him cunningly to the house of Manzoor, who intends to buy her. On reaching there she learns about the whole situation, she fights there with him and succeeds in escaping, meanwhile he gets killed by a knife accidentally in the fight. Manzoor's daughter reaches there and witnesses that Shabana was running from her house when his father was murdered.

Anwar tries to save her but couldn't succeed as all the evidences are turned against her. Judge Ashar first orders to hang her, but later he discovers that she is her long-lost daughter, thus decides to save her. He gets retirement from his judgeship and helps Anwar in the case when the case is challenged in High court. They win the case and Shabana gets save from the punishment.

Cast
The film cast Waheed Murad (as Anwar), Shamim Ara (as Shabana/ Salma), Tariq Aziz (as Ashar), Santosh Rissal (as Mrs. Ashar), Nighat Sultana (as Rasheeda), Nirala, Rehana Siddiqui and Talish.

Asif Ali Zardari, ex-president of Pakistan, acted as the young protagonist Waheed Murad. This is his only known film as a child actor.

Release
Salgira was released on the Valentines Day in 1969. The film completed 20 weeks at the main cinemas and 61 weeks at the other cinemas of Karachi and thus became a golden jubilee film.

Music
The music of Salgira is composed by Nashad and the lyrics are written by Shevan Rizvi and Taslim Fazli. Playback singers are Noor Jehan, Mehdi Hassan, Irene Parveen and Ahmed Rushdi.

Songography
Lay aai phir kahan par qismat hamein kahan se... by Noor Jehan
Meri zindgi hai naghma meri zindagi tarana... by Noor Jehan
Zulf ko teri ghataon ka... by Mehdi Hassan
Lazat-e-soz-e-jiger pooch le perwaney se... by Ahmed Rushdi & Irene Parveen
Tere wadey se meri zindagi saji... by Ahmed Rushdi & Irene Parveen

Awards
Salgirah won 2 Nigar Awards in the following categories:

References

External links
 

Asif Ali Zardari
1960s Urdu-language films
Pakistani romantic drama films
1969 films
Nigar Award winners
Urdu-language Pakistani films